The Parish of Old St Pancras (previously known as the St Pancras Team Ministry) was an ecclesiastical parish in the Church of England. It was formed on 1 June 2003 and consisted of four churches in north London – St Michael's Church, Camden Town; St Mary's Church, Somers Town; St Pancras Old Church; and St Paul's Church, Camden Square. It was split back into four separate parishes and PCCs on 1 March 2023.

Clergy
The parish employed four priests:
Father James Elston SSC, Team Vicar, St Pancras Old Church and St Paul's, Camden Square, and Team Rector
Father Michael Thomas, Team Vicar, St Michael's
Father Paschal Worton SSC, Team Vicar, St Mary's
Father Guy Willis SSC, Associate Priest
The first three of these remained the parish priests after the split in 2023, with Elston retaining responsibility for St Paul's Camden Square as well as St Pancras Old Church.

References

External links

2003 establishments in England
2023 disestablishments in England
Diocese of London